Below is a list of members of the Order of the Companions of Honour from the order's creation in 1917 until the present day.

Members

References

Further reading
 . leighrayment.com